Desislava Aleksandrova-Mladenova (born 27 October 1975) is a retired Bulgarian athlete who specialised in the high jump. She won a silver medal at the 1994 European Indoor Championships, setting a new European junior indoor record of 1.96 metres.

Her personal bests in the event are 1.93 metres outdoors (Rhodes 1997) and 1.96 metres indoors (Paris 1994).

Competition record

References

1975 births
Living people
Bulgarian female high jumpers
World Athletics Championships athletes for Bulgaria
20th-century Bulgarian women